Callisthenia is a genus of moths in the subfamily Arctiinae. The genus was erected by George Hampson in 1900.

Species
 Callisthenia angusta
 Callisthenia costilobata
 Callisthenia lacteata
 Callisthenia plicata
 Callisthenia ruberrima
 Callisthenia ruficollis
 Callisthenia schadei
 Callisthenia truncata
 Callisthenia variegata

References

External links

Lithosiini
Moth genera